Marcos Vicente dos Santos (born 29 September 1981), commonly known as Marquinhos, is a Brazilian former professional footballer who played as an attacking midfielder.

His brother Gustavo Santos is also a footballer.

Career statistics

Honours

Club
Avaí
Campeonato Catarinense: 2009

Santos
Campeonato Paulista: 2010
Copa do Brasil: 2010

Individual
Campeonato Catarinense Best midfielder: 2008, 2009, 2013
Campeonato Catarinense Best player: 2009, 2013

References

External links
 

1981 births
Living people
Sportspeople from Santa Catarina (state)
Brazilian footballers
Association football midfielders
Campeonato Brasileiro Série A players
Campeonato Brasileiro Série B players
Avaí FC players
CR Flamengo footballers
Paraná Clube players
São Paulo FC players
Coritiba Foot Ball Club players
Fortaleza Esporte Clube players
Iraty Sport Club players
Santa Cruz Futebol Clube players
Clube Atlético Mineiro players
Grêmio Foot-Ball Porto Alegrense players
Bayer 04 Leverkusen players
Bayer 04 Leverkusen II players
Brazilian expatriate footballers
Brazilian expatriate sportspeople in Germany
Expatriate footballers in Germany